The flag of the Sarakatsani is the flag representing the Sarakatsani people of Southeastern Europe.

Design 
The flag depicts a yellow cross in the middle, surrounded by a line that forms a square. The banner is attached to a hoist, with a top in the shape of a cross.

References

Sarakatsani
Sarakatsani
Sarakatsani
Sarakatsani
Sarakatsani
Sarakatsani
Sarakatsani
Sarakatsani
Macedonia